This page is a list of countries which have used or are current users of the Bell UH-1 Iroquois or are military users of the Bell 204 and 205, along with their military units.

Operators

Afghanistan
Afghan Air Force

Albania
Albanian Air Force

Argentina
Argentine Army
Argentine National Gendarmerie

Belize
Belize Defence Force

Brazil
Brazilian Air Force

Bolivia

Bolivian Air Force

Bosnia and Herzegovinia
Armed Forces of Bosnia-Herzegovina: Four Huey IIs delivered in December 4, 2021.

Burkina Faso
Armed Forces of Burkina Faso – 2 UH-1H

Chile
Chilean Air Force - UH-1D and UH-1H

Colombia
Colombian Air Force
Colombian Army
Colombian Police

Costa Rica
Air Vigilance Service

Dominican Republic
Dominican Republic Air Force

El Salvador
Air Force of El Salvador

Eswatini
Umbutfo Eswatini Defence Force

Ethiopia
Ethiopian Ground Forces - 8 UH-1H

Georgia
Georgian Air Force

Greece
Hellenic Air Force
Hellenic Army

Guatemala
Guatemalan Air Force

Honduras
Honduran Air Force

Indonesia
Indonesian Army - Bell 205A-1

Iraq
Iraqi Air Force

Italy
 Italian Army
 Italian Air Force operated 48 aircraft

Japan
Japan Ground Self-Defense Force - UH-1H and UH-1J

Kenya
Kenya Air Force – 8

Laos
Lao People's Liberation Army Air Force – 4 UH-1H

Lebanon
Lebanese Air Force

Morocco
Royal Moroccan Air Force

North Macedonia
Army of North Macedonia

Oman
Royal Air Force of Oman

Pakistan
Pakistan Air Force
Pakistan Army

Panama
National Aeronaval Service

Paraguay
Paraguayan Air Force

Philippines
Philippine Air Force

Saudi Arabia
Saudi Air Force

South Korea
South Korean Navy

Republic of China (Taiwan)
Republic of China Army
Republic of China Air Force

Thailand
Royal Thai Air Force

Turkey
Turkish Air Force
Turkish Army

Uganda
 UPDF Air Force

United States
United States Air Force
United States Army
NASA
United States Custom and Border Protection

Uruguay
Uruguayan Air Force

Venezuela
Venezuelan Air Force

Vietnam
Vietnam People's Air Force

Yemen
Yemeni Air Force

Zambia
Zambian Air Force

Former operators

Argentina
Argentine Air Force
Argentine Navy

Australia

Australian Army
1st Aviation Regiment
5th Aviation Regiment
171st Aviation Squadron
Australian Defence Force Helicopter School
School of Army Aviation
Royal Australian Air Force
No. 5 Squadron RAAF
No. 9 Squadron RAAF
No. 35 Squadron RAAF
Aircraft Research and Development Unit
School of Radio
Royal Australian Navy
723 Squadron RAN

Austria
Austrian Air Force

Cambodia
Khmer Air Force

Canada

Canadian Forces
417 Combat Support Squadron
439 Combat Support Squadron
Base Flight Cold Lake
Base Flight Bagotville
Base Rescue Chatham
Base Rescue Moose Jaw

Ethiopia
Ethiopian Navy

Germany
German Army Aviation Corps
German Air Force
Bundesgrenzschutz

Indonesia

Indonesian Air Force - Bell 204B

Israel
Israeli Air Force

Italy
Italian Air Force

Jamaica
Jamaica Defence Force

Jordan
Royal Jordanian Air Force

Netherlands
Royal Netherlands Navy

New Zealand

Royal New Zealand Air Force
No. 3 Squadron RNZAF
No. 41 Squadron RNZAF
No. 141 Flight RNZAF

North Yemen
Yemen Arab Republic Air Force

Norway
Royal Norwegian Air Force

Papua New Guinea
Air Operations Element

Peru
 Peruvian Air Force: 11 UH-1D delivered in 1965 plus one UH-1H later delivered.  At least one UH-1D converted to UH-1H standard.

Rhodesia  
 Royal Rhodesian Air Force
No. 8 Squadron

Singapore
Republic of Singapore Air Force
120 SQN

Kingdom of Laos
 Royal Lao Air Force

South Korea
South Korean Army
Republic of Korea Air Force

South Vietnam
Republic of Vietnam Air Force

Spain
Spanish Air Force
Spanish Army Airmobile Force

Suriname
Suriname Air Force

Sweden
Designation helikopter (hkp) 3. Models: A (original engine), B (better engine), C (bigger rotor).

Swedish Army
Swedish Air Force

Thailand
Royal Thai Army

Uganda
Ugandan Defense Force

United States
United States Marine Corps
United States Navy

Zimbabwe
Air Force of Zimbabwe

See also
Bell UH-1N Twin Huey
Bell UH-1Y Venom
Bell 212
Bell 214

References

Bibliography
 Gunston, Bill, An Illustrated Guide to Military Helicopters, Salamander Books, London 1981. 

Lists of military units and formations by aircraft
UH-1 Iroquois